The 1990–91 ADT Security Systems Rugby Union County Championship was the 91st edition of England's County Championship rugby union club competition. 

Cornwall won their second title (but first since 1908) after defeating  Yorkshire in the final.  The significant Cornwall following resulted in a new record attendance of 56,000 at Twickenham Stadium. The final signified the greatest match in the history of the competition.

Final

See also
 English rugby union system
 Rugby union in England

References

Rugby Union County Championship
County Championship (rugby union) seasons